The Ba River (巴江), located in China, is the largest tributary of the Nanpan River. It is the source of the Dadieshui Waterfall.

See also
List of rivers in China

External links
The Stone Forest in Yunnan

Rivers of Yunnan
Geography of Kunming